Aredda is a village in western Eritrea.

Location
The town is located in the subregion of the Gash-Barka region. It is situated 5.1 miles from Attai.

References

Villages in Eritrea